Ignatios the Deacon (780/790 – after 845) was a Byzantine cleric and writer. Left an orphan as a child, he was educated under the auspices of Patriarch Tarasios of Constantinople, and rose in the church hierarchy under Tarasios' successor, Nikephoros I, becoming a deacon and skeuophylax of the Hagia Sophia. After the start of the second period of the Byzantine Iconoclasm ca. 814, he sided with the iconoclasts, becoming metropolitan bishop of the prestigious see of Nicaea, probably in the 830s. He later reversed his stance, however, and retired as a monk at about the time of the definite end of Iconoclasm in 843. Ignatios was the confirmed or probable author of several saints' lives (hagiographies), funeral elegies, letters and poems.

Sources 
 
 

780s births
840s deaths
9th-century Byzantine bishops
9th-century Byzantine monks
Bishops of Nicaea
Byzantine Iconoclasm
9th-century Byzantine writers
Year of birth unknown
Year of death unknown